The Ultraverse is a defunct comic book imprint published by the American company Malibu Comics which is currently owned by Marvel Comics. The Ultraverse is a shared universe in which a variety of characters – known within the comics as Ultras – acquired super-human abilities.

History
The Ultraverse line was launched by Malibu Comics during the "comics boom" of the early 1990s, when a number of new and existing publishers introduced new universes featuring superheroes, debuting in June 1993 with ongoing series Prime, Hardcase and The Strangers. The project included writers Mike W. Barr, Steve Englehart, Steve Gerber, James D. Hudnall, Gerard Jones, James Robinson, Len Strazewski, and Larry Niven. It emphasized tight continuity between the various series, making extensive use of crossovers, in which a story that began in one series would be continued in the next-shipping issue of another series. Various promotions for special editions or limited-print stories also encouraged readers to sample issues of the entire line. The Ultraverse line came to dominate Malibu's catalog, and a short-lived animated series was based on the team series Ultraforce in 1994–1995.

As American comics sales declined in the mid-1990s, Malibu canceled lower-selling series. The company was purchased by Marvel Comics in November 1994. Marvel reportedly made the purchase to acquire Malibu's then-groundbreaking in-house coloring studio, with some speculation that it was to prevent DC Comics from buying it to increase their market share. Within the Marvel Comics multiverse, the Ultraverse was designated as Earth-93060. Crossovers between Malibu and Marvel began, such as Rune/Silver Surfer.

In 1995, Marvel published a crossover story called "Black September" featuring the members of Ultraforce and Marvel's Avengers, which ended with the cancellation of all of the series in the Ultraverse line. Seven of the series – Prime, Mantra, Night Man, Ultraforce, Rune, Siren, The New Exiles – were "rebooted" with issues numbered "#∞", followed by volume 2, in which popular Marvel characters were briefly featured to attract Marvel's regular readers. This version of the Ultraverse lasted until the end of 1996, with a one-shot published in February 1997 to wrap up unresolved plot lines.

Status
In 2003, Steve Englehart was commissioned by Marvel to relaunch the Ultraverse with the most recognizable characters, but editorial decided finally not to resurrect the imprint. In June 2005, when asked by Newsarama whether Marvel had any plans to revive the Ultraverse, Marvel editor-in-chief Joe Quesada replied that:

Senior Vice President of Publishing Tom Brevoort has stated in the past that the reason Marvel cannot discuss the Ultraverse properties is because of non-disclosure agreements in place with certain parties, which has been speculated to pertain to Scott Mitchell Rosenberg's contractual position as "ongoing producer deal for all Malibu Comics properties".

In February 2021, when Simon Spurrier, writer of the 2021 Black Knight series, was asked about the possibility of the series taking place in the Ultraverse, he said: "None percent, I'm afraid".

Titles

Characters

Crossovers with Marvel Comics
Godwheel
Rune/Silver Surfer
Spine (Lord Pumpkin #1, Hardcase #23, Ultraforce vol.1 #8, Curse of Rune #2, Mantra vol.1 #22, Eliminator #3, Lord Pumkin #4, The Nightman #22 )
Black September
Countdown to Black September (Ultraforce Vol. 1 #8-10, Ultraforce/Avengers Prelude )
Avengers/Ultraforce
Ultraforce/Avengers
Siren #∞ -3
Ultraforce vol.2 #∞-12
Prime vol.2 #∞-5
All New Exiles #∞-11
Rune Vol.2 #∞-7
Prime vs. the Incredible Hulk
Nightman vs. Wolverine
The All-New Exiles vs. X-Men
The Phoenix Resurrection
Conan vs. Rune (Also Conan #4 and Conan the Barbarian #4)
Ultraforce/Spider-Man
Nightman/Gambit
Prime/Captain America
Rune vs. Venom
Ultraverse Unlimited #1-2
Ultraverse Future Shock

Other media
 In 1995, a 13-episode animated series featuring the characters of Ultraforce was produced by DIC Productions, L.P. and Bohbot Entertainment. The series also featured Sludge, the Night Man, and the Strangers.
 A live action series featuring the character Night Man aired in syndication from September 1997 to May 1999.
 The Ultraforce character Topaz (created by Mike W. Barr) was portrayed by Rachel House in the film Thor: Ragnarok (2017) and the related short film Team Daryl, produced by Marvel Studios.

References

Sources

External links
Ryan McLelland on the history of the Ultraverse
Joe Quesada on Ultraverse revivals
Rich Johnston's Lying in the Gutters, speaking with creators on an Ultraverse revival
Details of the Ultraverse
Details of Ultraforce

 
Fictional universes